Aylesbury Grammar School is a grammar school in Aylesbury situated in the English county of Buckinghamshire, which educates approximately 1300 students.

Founded in 1598 in Aylesbury, Buckinghamshire by Sir Henry Lee, Champion of Queen Elizabeth I, Aylesbury Grammar School celebrated 100 years on its current site in Walton Road in 2007. It is commonly referred to by its students, staff and others in the local area by the abbreviation AGS.

Admissions
As a selective state school, its entry requirements are dictated by the Buckinghamshire Transfer Test, formerly known as the '11-plus'. The school also takes students from outside the catchment area or out of county locations such as Thame and Milton Keynes, if spaces remain after all qualified in-catchment candidates have taken up their places.

The school educates boys from the age of 11, in Year 7, through to the age of 18, in Year 13. The school has its largest intakes at Year 7 followed by Year 12. On completing GCSEs, the vast majority of students stay on to complete their A-levels at the school's Sixth Form.

The school is situated east of the town centre on the southern side of the A41, between Walton (to the west) and Victoria Park (to the east). This site was built and opened in 1907, replacing an earlier building in St. Mary's Square in the town centre, which now forms part of the Buckinghamshire Museum.

Specialist status
In September 1997 the school was awarded specialist school status in Technology, and later successfully gained Science College status as its primary specialism. In April 2006 AGS gained a second college status as a Language College and then gained a second secondary college status in Maths and Computing in January 2008. The Specialist School programme was ended by the Government in 2010.

Academy status
In July 2011 the school became an Academy.

History

Single sex school
The school was created as a boys school from 1598 until 1907 when the school relocated to a new site on Walton Road, where it remains to this day. One condition, in order to receive funding for the new premises, was for the school to become co-educational. In the mid-1950s the school was rapidly outgrowing its site and so plans for a new school were made and the Council decided to reinstate the single-sex status and in 1959 the girls of Aylesbury Grammar School moved into their new school on the opposite side of the road, now called Aylesbury High School.

The current Headmaster is Mark Sturgeon who took over from Stephen Lehec at the start of the 2014–15 academic year.

Houses
Each student is placed into one of six Houses upon starting at the school, students are generally separated from others who they went to the same primary school with. The six houses are:

House trophy competitions
Each year, the school Houses compete in two trophy competitions: The Brodie Trophy (Sports) and The Watson Trophy (Arts). The Brodie Trophy was first contested in 1939 and was named in memory of Mr Palmer Brodie, a popular teacher involved in organising extra-curricular activities who died in a car crash in 1938. The Watson Trophy was first contested in 1968 and was named in memory of Colonel F.W. Watson, a former Chair of the Governing Body and friend of the school who died in 1966. In the current era the two trophies include the following events - Brodie (Athletics, Badminton, Basketball, Cross-Country, Football, Rugby, Squash, Swimming and Tennis), and Watson (Art, Chess, Music, Public Speaking, Quiz and Writing).

At the end of each event the houses gain points for their placements and at the end of the year, these points are tallied up and a winner is declared for each trophy.

Students have one House assembly per week.

Teaching system

In the first two years of the school, students are almost exclusively taught in their houses (with the exceptions of Maths and Physical Education, in which pupils are streamed by ability in year 8–9, and by their second Foreign Language choice in year 8–9; until the 2008-09 academic year, where year 7s are now assigned two languages – French and either German or Spanish according to the house (Denson, Hampden and Lee study German; Paterson, Phillips and Ridley study Spanish) and then start learning Latin in year 8). Tutor groups are also split up into groups of 20 for Design Technology lessons. From the start of the 2018-19 Academic Year, students in Year 9 are taught in teaching groups rather than their House groups.

In Year 10 and above, the year group is reshuffled into different classes for each subject depending on their GCSE options.

Academic performance
In 2009, the school achieved the highest A-level results in Buckinghamshire.

AGS in the news 
In May 1907 Aylesbury Grammar School moved to its current location on Walton Road, Aylesbury and the new premises, designed by local architect Fred Taylor A.R.I.B.A, were welcomed to cope with the ever-expanding numbers of students. The guest of honour at the opening ceremony was Lord Rothchild who had offered the land for purchase to Buckinghamshire County Council to build the school. As a condition of a grant from the Council to assist in constructing the new buildings both boys and girls were admitted to the new school.

In December 1953 damage was caused by a fire, later attributed to faulty electrical wiring. The school fully reopened in the Easter of 1954. The damaged roof was replaced and a new hall, entrance area and classrooms were constructed.

On 9 May 2014, boys at the school dressed up as the Jamaican bobsleigh team for their school-leaving celebrations and 'blacked up' as part of their costume. This came to public attention when an image of the schoolboys was tweeted by the then headmaster Stephen Lehec and was criticised for being racist. Lehec issued a formal apology, though in his analysis 'at no time was there an undertone of any act being of a derogatory or racist nature'. The matter was widely reported in local and national media.

Notable people associated with Aylesbury Grammar School

Notable former pupils

 Will Adam (b. 1969) Archdeacon of Canterbury
 Jake Arnott (b. 1961) author, left school at 16 
 Richard Baron, philosopher
 Tim Besley, economist and former Member of the Bank of England's Monetary Policy Committee 
 Angela Billingham (b. 31 July 1939), politician 
 Rutland Boughton (1878–1960), composer 
 Richard Bracewell (b. 1969), director, producer and scriptwriter
 Jules Buckley (b. 1980), conductor
 Kevin Cecil, (b. 1969), scriptwriter
 Scott Davies, (b. 1988), professional footballer
 Tom Dyckhoff, (b. 1971), architecture critic and TV presenter 
 John Edwards OBE (1904–1959), Labour MP from 1950–9 for Brighouse and Spenborough
 David Gurr (b. 1956), cricketer for Oxford University and Somerset
 Alaric Hall (b. 1979), philologist
 Tim Harford (b. 1973), journalist and presenter
 Arthur Hughes (b. 1992), Actor 
 Theo James (b. 1984), English actor and producer
 Sam Jones, (b. 1991), professional rugby player for Wasps RFC
 Richard Lee (b. 1982), footballer
 David Millar (b. 1977), cyclist and commentator
 Kris Needs (b. 1954), journalist and author
Christian Purslow (b.1963), former Managing Director of Liverpool Football Club, Chief Executive of Aston Villa Football Club
 Andy Riley, (b. 1970), author and scriptwriter
 Eddie Robson, (b. 1978), author and scriptwriter
 Peter Rost, Conservative MP from 1983–92 for Erewash and from 1970–83 for South East Derbyshire
 Kevin Sacre, actor
 Peter Smith, Biologist 
 Rob Stringer, chairman of Columbia/Epic Label Group, and brother of Sir Howard Stringer
 Frederick Taylor, historian
 Shailesh Vara, Conservative MP since 2005 for North West Cambridgeshire
Toby Vintcent, (b.1962), Writer, Politician and former soldier
 Alex Wilkie FRS, (b. 1948) mathematician
 Theodore Zeldin CBE, author and historian

See also

Aylesbury High School
Dr Challoner's Grammar School
Royal Grammar School
Sir William Borlase's Grammar School
List of English and Welsh endowed schools (19th century)

References

External links
 Department for Education Performance Tables
 EduBase

News items
 Admissions in August 2000

Boys' schools in Buckinghamshire
Aylesbury
Grammar schools in Buckinghamshire
1598 establishments in England
Educational institutions established in the 1590s
Academies in Buckinghamshire